The 1963 Kansas Jayhawks football team represented the University of Kansas in the Big Eight Conference during the 1963 NCAA University Division football season. In their sixth season under head coach Jack Mitchell, the Jayhawks compiled a 5–5 record (3–4 against conference opponents), tied for fourth in the Big Eight Conference, and outscored all opponents by a combined total of 207 to 122. They played their home games at Memorial Stadium in Lawrence, Kansas.

The team's statistical leaders included Gale Sayers with 917 rushing yards and 155 receiving yards and Steve Renko with 505 passing yards. Ken Coleman and Pete Quatrochi were the team captains.

Schedule

Roster

References

Kansas
Kansas Jayhawks football seasons
Kansas Jayhawks football